Shoploop is a new generation video shopping platform developed by Google that enables products to be promoted within a maximum of 90 seconds.

References

External links 
 

Google software
E-commerce websites
E-commerce software